Piscataway School Board v. Taxman, 91 F.3d 1547 (3d Cir. 1996) is a United States labor law case on racial discrimination, that began in 1989 against the Piscataway Township Schools.

Facts
The school board of Piscataway, New Jersey needed to eliminate a teaching position from the high school's Business Education department. Under New Jersey state law, tenured teachers have to be laid off in reverse order of seniority. However, the board faced a problem, as the district's least senior tenured teachers, Sharon Taxman (a white teacher) and Debra Williams (an African-American teacher), had started working at the school on the same day, and thus had equal seniority. In the interest of maintaining racial diversity (Williams was the only African-American teacher in the department, and 50% of the students were minorities), the school board voted to lay off Taxman. Taxman complained to the EEOC, saying that the board had violated Title VII of the Civil Rights Act of 1964, and was given authority to file suit against the board.

Judgment
The United States Court of Appeals for the Third Circuit ruled in favor of Taxman.

Significance
The school board appealed to the United States Supreme Court and a hearing was scheduled for January 1998, but civil rights groups, fearing that the case could lead to the prohibition of affirmative action, provided money for the board to settle the case out of court, so the case was never heard.

Taxman was subsequently rehired, and later reassigned to Conackamack Middle School.

Williams retired at the conclusion of the 2009–2010 school year.

See also
 United States labor law
 Ricci v. DeStefano
 United Steelworkers v. Weber
 Griggs v. Duke Power Co.

Notes

External links
 96-679 In the Supreme Court of the United States
 Piscataway v. Taxman on Project LEGAL
 

Education in Middlesex County, New Jersey
United States Court of Appeals for the Third Circuit cases
United States employment discrimination case law
1996 in United States case law
United States public employment case law
Piscataway, New Jersey
United States affirmative action case law
Termination of employment
United States racial discrimination case law